Strong Love Affair is a 1996 album by Ray Charles released on Warner Bros. Records.

Track listing
"All She Wants to Do is Love Me" – 4:15  
"Say No More" – 4:19
"No Time to Waste Time" – 3:38
"Angelina" – 4:06
"Tell Me What You Want Me to Do" (Ray Charles) – 5:21
"Strong Love Affair" – 4:08
"Everybody's Handsome Child" – 3:56
"Out of My Life" – 4:25
"The Fever" – 3:46
"Separate Ways" – 4:07
"I Need a Good Woman Bad" – 4:59 
"If You Give Me Your Heart" – 4:27

References

External links
 []

1996 albums
Ray Charles albums
Warner Records albums